David Thomas Culbert (born 17 March 1967 in Sydney) is a former international track and field athlete. In an international long jump career that spanned ten years, he won two Commonwealth Games silver medals in 1990 and 1994  and also made finals at the 1992 Olympics.

Since his retirement, he has established himself as Australia's track and field commentator working with Channel 7 and SBS as well as various radio stations. In 2004 and 2005 he hosted a Sunday morning discussion show, The Insiders on Melbourne station SEN 1116.

In his role as a commentator, he has called Athletics at the 2000, 2004 and 2008 Olympic Games, 1998 and 2002 and 2006 Commonwealth Games and the past five World Athletics Championships.

He has also held the role of reporter/producer on Channel Seven programs Talking Footy, The Olympic Show and Sportsworld.

Culbert runs a sports media, promotion and marketing firm called Jump Media and has clients including Athletics Australia and the Australian Commonwealth Games Association.

He has worked on projects for Hockey Australia, the International Triathlon Union and Gymnastics Australia.

References

Profile

External links
Jump Media

1967 births
Living people
Australian male long jumpers
Athletes (track and field) at the 1988 Summer Olympics
Athletes (track and field) at the 1992 Summer Olympics
Athletes (track and field) at the 1986 Commonwealth Games
Athletes (track and field) at the 1990 Commonwealth Games
Athletes (track and field) at the 1994 Commonwealth Games
Olympic athletes of Australia
Athletes from Sydney
Australian Institute of Sport track and field athletes
Commonwealth Games medallists in athletics
Commonwealth Games silver medallists for Australia
Medallists at the 1990 Commonwealth Games
Medallists at the 1994 Commonwealth Games